Assorted Jelly Beans is the first album by Assorted Jelly Beans. It was released in 1996 by Kung Fu Records. According to KungFu Records, it has sold over 25,000 copies, and was the first release from Kung Fu Records.

Track listing
 "No Time" - 2:24
 "Plain Life" - 2:22
 "Braindead" - 2:38
 "8th Grade Nerd" - 2:33
 "In Our Eyes" - 2:38
 "Don't Ask Me" - 2:39
 "Punk Rock Jock" - 2:11
 "Assorted Jelly Beans" - 2:11
 "You'll Never Know" - 2:20
 "Another Way" - 2:04
 "Mr. Bill" - 2:28
 "Newska One" - 2:33
 "Doobage" - 2:03

References

Assorted Jelly Beans albums
1996 debut albums